National Front or Front National can refer to the following political parties and coalitions:

Africa
 Botswana National Front
 National Front for the Salvation of Libya
 Namibia National Front
 Front National (South Africa) , a Boer-Afrikaner political party in South Africa
 South African National Front, neo-fascist organisation associated with the British National Front
 Swaziland National Front, a political party in Swaziland

Asia
 Chin National Front, a political and military organization in Burma
 Mizo National Front, India
 National Front (India)
 National Front (Iran) (Jebhe-ye Melli Iran)
 Barisan Nasional (National Front) in Malaysia
 Balawaristan National Front, Pakistan
 United National Front (Sri Lanka)

Europe
 National Front (Albania)
 Partyja BPF, Belarus
 National Front (Belgium)
 Bulgarian National Front
 National Front (Czechoslovakia)
 National Front (East Germany)
 European National Front
 Rahvarinne, Estonia
 Finnish People's Blue-whites, known as National Front 1997–2001
 National Front (French Resistance), a World War II French Resistance group
 Front National des Musiciens, an organization of musicians in Nazi-occupied France
 Nationalist Front (Germany), a German neo-Nazi group that is sometimes translated as National Front
 National Front (Greece)
 National Front (Hungary)
 National Front (Italy, 1967)
 National Front (Italy, 1990)
 National Front (Italy, 1997)
 Black Front (Netherlands) (1934–41), known as National Front 1940–41
 National Front (Spain, 1986)
 National Front (Spain, 2006)
 National Front (Switzerland)
 National Front (UK), a far-right fascist British political party founded in 1967, which peaked during the 1970s1980s and declined in the 1990s
 National Rally, a far-right political party in France formerly known as "National Front" or "Front National" until 2018

Other places
 National Front (Australia)
 National Front (Colombia) (1958–1974), an agreement between the Liberal and Conservative parties
 New Zealand National Front

See also
 National Front Party (disambiguation)
 National Resistance Front (disambiguation)
 Popular Front (disambiguation)
 United Front (disambiguation)